The year 2008 was the third year in the history of Strikeforce, a mixed martial arts promotion based in the United States. In 2008 Strikeforce held eight events, beginning with Strikeforce: Young Guns II.

Title fights

Events list

Strikeforce: Young Guns II

Strikeforce: Young Guns II was an event held on February 1, 2008 at the San Jose Civic Auditorium in San Jose, California.

Results

Strikeforce: At The Dome

Strikeforce: At The Dome was an event held on February 23, 2008 at the San Jose Civic Auditorium in San Jose, California.

Results

Strikeforce: Shamrock vs. Le

Strikeforce: Shamrock vs. Le was an event held on March 29, 2008 at the San Jose Civic Auditorium in San Jose, California.

Results

Strikeforce: Melendez vs. Thomson

Strikeforce: Melendez vs. Thomson was an event held on June 27, 2008, at the San Jose Civic Auditorium in San Jose, California.

Results

Strikeforce: Young Guns III

Strikeforce: Young Guns III was an event held on September 13, 2008 at the San Jose Civic Auditorium in San Jose, California.

Results

Strikeforce: At The Mansion II

Strikeforce: At The Mansion II was an event held on September 20, 2008 at the San Jose Civic Auditorium in San Jose, California.

Results

Strikeforce: Payback

Strikeforce: Payback was an event held on October 3, 2008 at the San Jose Civic Auditorium in San Jose, California.

Results

Strikeforce: Destruction

Strikeforce: Destruction was an event held on November 21, 2008, at the San Jose Civic Auditorium in San Jose, California.

Results

See also 
 List of Strikeforce champions
 List of Strikeforce events

References

Strikeforce (mixed martial arts) events
2008 in mixed martial arts